The Haunted House is a 1917 American silent mystery film directed by Albert Parker and starring Winifred Allen, Richard Rosson and Albert Day.

Cast
 Winifred Allen as 	Anne
 Richard Rosson as 	Jimmy 
 Albert Parker as 	The Uncle
 Albert Day as Anne's Uncle
 Mac Barnes as The Sheriff
 Mabel Wright as 	Anne's Mother
 Eddie Kelly as 	The yegg

References

Bibliography
 Lombardi, Frederic . Allan Dwan and the Rise and Decline of the Hollywood Studios. McFarland, 2013.

External links
 

1910s American films
1917 films
1917 mystery films
1910s English-language films
American silent feature films
American mystery films
American black-and-white films
Films directed by Albert Parker
Triangle Film Corporation films
Silent mystery films